Kavya Thapar is an Indian actress and model who predominantly works in Telugu, Tamil and Hindi films.

Early life
Thapar was born 20 August 1995 in Maharashtra. She completed her school life from Bombay Scottish School, Powai. After completing school life she admitted into Thakur College of Science and Commerce.

Career

Thapar's first work in the entertainment arena was a Hindi short film titled Tatkal. She also appeared in advertisements including Patanjali, MakeMyTrip and Kohinoor.

Her Telugu film Ee Maaya Peremito was released in 2018. This film was her first Telugu film. In 2019 her Tamil film Market Raja MBBS was released. This film was her first Tamil film. Her next signed film is an untitled film alongside Vijay Antony.

In early October 2022 she has announced her next Telugu film alongside Ravi Teja.

Filmography

References

vbn

External links

Living people
1995 births
Indian film actresses
Actresses from Mumbai
Female models from Mumbai
Actresses in Hindi cinema
Actresses in Telugu cinema
Actresses in Tamil cinema
Thakur College of Science and Commerce alumni
21st-century Indian actresses